is a CD single by Japanese singer and voice actress Aya Hirano. It was released on October 8, 2008, and produced by Lantis. The song is used as the ending theme song for the anime Hyakko.

Track listing
 
 Vocals: Aya Hirano
 Lyrics: Tsunku
 Arranger: Hirata Shiyōitirō
 "WIN"
 Vocals: Aya Hirano
 Lyrics: Tsunku
 Arranger: Daichi Hideyuki Suzuki
 
 "WIN" (off vocal)

References

2008 singles
Aya Hirano songs
Lantis (company) singles
Songs written by Tsunku
2008 songs